Gamamathige Vijitha de Silva (born 5 July 1943 – died 16 October 1992 as විජිත මල්ලිකා) [Sinhala]), popularly as Vijitha Mallika, was an actress in Sri Lankan cinema. One of the most popular film actresses in early Sinhala cinema, Mallika appeared in more than 40 films including popular films, Suvineetha Lalani, Sengawunu Menika, Dheewarayo, London Hamu and Sweep Ticket.

Personal life
Mallika was born on 5 July 1943 in Negombo as the eldest of the family.   Her father Gamamathige Silva was a businessman came to Negambo from Induruwa and started a business. Her mother was Mary Wickramasinghe. Mallika has three younger brothers - Austin, Sunil, Mahinda - and two younger sisters - Chandra and Swarna.  Mallika's father's younger sister was married to film actor Boniface Fernando. Also, Vijitha's cousin, Milissina was a stage actress. Mallika's mother's brother, Benjamin Fernando, was a playwright and stage actor in Negombo at the time. Benjamin was the father of popular film actress Lina Fernando.

Mallika studied at Sinhala New School, Wella Street, Negombo and then from Newstead Girls College, Negambo. Mallika was married to fellow actor Anton Fernando. She met Fernando during the casting of Veera Vijaya. At that time, Anton was the harmonium player of a band in Negombo. Anton and Vijitha's love affair had obstacles from both sides, due to religious conflicts. Mallika was Buddhist and Anton was Catholic. Later, Mallika converted to Catholicism and married Anton. For this, a religious father by the name of Pagna and a religious mother by the name of Mannah had to be named. However, after many conflicts, they divorced in 1970.

A few years later, she married Gamini Munasinghe, a prominent businessman in Negombo. After marrying Gamini Munasinghe, Vijitha returned to Buddhism. Gamini's brother, Ananda Munasinghe was married to the eldest daughter of popular actor and director B. A. W. Jayamanne. Gamini's other brother, Priya Munasinghe was a well known motor car champion.

Mallika has two daughters from her first marriage with Anton. Elder daughter Shiranthi Fernando is married to furniture businessman Upali de Silva. Second daughter Priyanthi Fernando is married to the teledrama actor Kuma Attanayake. Kuma died suddenly in 2018. Mallika has one son and one daughter from her second marriage with Gamini. Elder son is Ranga and daughter is Erangi.

She suffered from a cancer for two years and she lived a righteous life in late stage. Mallika died on 16 October 1992 at the age of 49.

Career
At very young age, Mallika showcased the signs to be a future actress. Mallika's uncle, Benjamin Fernando often known as Benjamin Master was a friend of playwright and dialogue writer Hugo Fernando. When Hugo saw her at the house, she expressed her intentions to be an actress. With that guidance from Hugo Master, Mallika made her cinema debut as a minor role in 1967 film Suraya directed by T.R. Sundaram. She was then offered many comic roles in popular films, Sohoyuro (1958), Purusha Rathnaya (1959). Then, in 1960, she acted as the girl friend opposite to Cristy Leonard in the film Veera Vijaya.

Hugo Master, who wrote the dialogue for the film Adata Wada Heta Hondai which was started in 1962 by newly established Hendala Wijaya studio gave a major role to Mallika along with two popular actresses of her generation, Jeevarani Kurukulasuriya and Sandhya Kumari. Mallika was Ananda Jayaratne's girlfriend in the film. Then he acted in the film Samanalayo starring with Tony Ranasinghe. Although the footage was filmed, it was stuck in production stage. In 1963, Mallika appeared in the blockbuster film Dheewarayo along with Sandhya Kumari and Gamini Fonseka. According to critics, Mallika lost the main role after losing the toss to decide the role with Sandhya. Sandhya made a major role and Mallika made a supportive role. However, her destiny was changed after the film, where Mallika was fortunate enough to get major roles in films in following years.

Mallika acted major roles in films Hithata Hitha, Sweep Ticket and Handa Paana. Mallika's lover in the movie Sweep Ticket was Sudesh Gunaratne. In the film Handa Paana, she acted as a village girl Kusuma opposite to Herbert M. Seneviratne. Among the films Mallika acted in, 1963 film Suhada Sohoyuro gained more attraction. In 1966, Mallika won the Sarasaviya Award for Most Popular Actress for the film Handa Paana.  In 1970, Mallika produced the film Suli Sulang which was directed by her husband Anton Fernando before the divorce. Her last appearance in cinema came through 1980 film Hondin Inna directed by Bandu Gunasekara.

A felicitation ceremony titled Dawasak Evi for Vijitha Mallika was held on 18 March 2017 at Maradana Tower Hall.

Filmography

References

External links

1943 births
1992 deaths
Sri Lankan film actresses
Sinhalese actresses